There are currently 118 known chemical elements exhibiting many different physical and chemical properties. Amongst this diversity, scientists have found it useful to use names for various sets of elements, that illustrate similar properties, or their trends of properties. Many of these sets are formally recognized by the standards body IUPAC.

The following collective names are recommended by IUPAC:
Alkali metals – The metals of group 1: Li, Na, K, Rb, Cs, Fr.
Alkaline earth metals – The metals of group 2: Be, Mg, Ca, Sr, Ba, Ra.
Transition elements – Elements in groups 3 to 11 or 3 to 12 (the latter equalling the d-block).
Pnictogens – The elements of group 15: N, P, As, Sb, Bi. (Mc had not yet been named when the 2005 IUPAC Red Book was published, and its chemical properties are not yet experimentally known.)
Chalcogens – The elements of group 16: O, S, Se, Te, Po. (Lv had not yet been named when the 2005 IUPAC Red Book was published, and its chemical properties are not yet experimentally known.)
Halogens – The elements of group 17: F, Cl, Br, I, At. (Ts had not yet been named when the 2005 IUPAC Red Book was published, and its chemical properties are not yet experimentally known.)
Noble gases – The elements of group 18: He, Ne, Ar, Kr, Xe, Rn. (Og had not yet been named when the 2005 IUPAC Red Book was published, and its chemical properties are not yet experimentally known.)
Lanthanides – Elements 57–71: La, Ce, Pr, Nd, Pm, Sm, Eu, Gd, Tb, Dy, Ho, Er, Tm, Yb, Lu.
Actinides – Elements 89–103: Ac, Th, Pa, U, Np, Pu, Am, Cm, Bk, Cf, Es, Fm, Md, No, Lr.
Rare-earth metals – Sc, Y, plus the lanthanides.
Inner transition elements – f-block elements.
Main group elements – Elements in groups 1–2 or 13–18, sometimes excluding hydrogen.

Another common classification is by degree of metallic – metalloidal – nonmetallic behaviour and characteristics. There is no general agreement on the name to use for these sets. Very often these categories are marked by a background color in the periodic table.
 Transition elements are sometimes referred to as transition metals.
 Lanthanoids and actinoids are sometimes referred to as lanthanides and actinides respectively.

Many other names for sets of elements are in common use, and yet others have been used throughout history. These sets usually do not aim to cover the whole periodic table (as for example period does), and often overlap or have boundaries that differ between authors. Some examples:
Metals and nonmetals
Metalloids – Variously-defined group of elements with properties intermediate between metals and nonmetals.
In alphabetic order:
Coinage metals – Various metals used to mint coins, primarily the group 11 elements Cu, Ag, and Au.
Earth metal – Old historic term, usually referred to the metals of groups 3 and 13, although sometimes others such as beryllium and chromium are included as well.
Heavy metals – Variously-defined group of metals, on the base of their density, atomic number, or toxicity.
Heavy atom – term used in computational chemistry to refer to any element other than hydrogen and helium.
Minor actinides – Actinides found in significant quantities in nuclear fuel, other than U and Pu: Np, Am, Cm.
Native metals – Metals that occur pure in nature, including the noble metals and others such as Sn and Pb.
Noble metals – Variously-defined group of metals that are generally resistant to corrosion. Usually includes Ag, Au, and the platinum-group metals.
Non-ferrous metals - Metals or alloys that do not contain iron in appreciable amounts.
Platinum group – Ru, Rh, Pd, Os, Ir, Pt.
Post-transition metals – The metals coming after the transition metals. Many other names have been used for this set, and its borders are not agreed on.
Precious metals – Variously-defined group of non-radioactive metals of high economical value.
Superactinides – Hypothetical series of elements 121 to 157, which includes a predicted "g-block" of the periodic table.
Transactinide elements – Elements after the actinides (atomic number greater than 103).
Transplutonium elements – Elements with atomic number greater than 94.
Transuranium elements – Elements with atomic number greater than 92.
Valve metal - a metal which, in an electrolytic cell, passes current in only one direction.

References

External links

 
Chemical nomenclature